Gariz, also rendered as Karez or Kariz, may refer to:
 Gariz-e Olya
 Gariz-e Sofla